Newberry High School is a public high school located at 400 SW 258th Street in the city of Newberry, Florida. It is a 1A school. The school offers a magnet program in criminal justice, numerous clubs, and an athletic program. NHS was rated an A school for the 2012–2013 school year.

Academics

Academy of Criminal Justice 
Newberry High School's Academy of Criminal Justice magnet program was founded by Jackie Whitworth. It prepares students for careers in law enforcement. The curriculum includes classes in law enforcement, self-defense, and forensic investigation. Students participate in "Teen Court", the Sheriff's Explorers program, and the Guardian Ad Litem program. The magnet program is currently directed by Patrick Treese. Former directors of the program include Greg Smith and Jackie Whitworth.

Exceptional Student Education 
The Exceptional Student Education Department serves students with special needs including, but not limited to: learning disabled, emotionally handicapped, physically impaired, speech and language impaired, and gifted. Each ESE student is assigned a caseworker and an individualized education program based on their needs.

Extra curricular activities 
There are twelve clubs at Newberry High School. Their goal is to promote active leadership, success, and achievement.  The clubs are made up of Panthers in grades 9-12.

Band 
The Newberry High School band is called the "Band of Pride". The Marching Band can be seen at every home game, and some away games. The Marching Band also travels to many competitions throughout August and November. The "Band of Pride" received second place overall at the FMBC state competition in 2013. The Band of Pride has also been invited to the Memorial Day Parade in 2015. The concert band went to state for MPA district assessment in 2015 and received an overall Superior rating.  The Symphonic Band performs several concerts including Winter and Spring. The band has gone through several changes in leadership within the past couple of years and is now under the direction of James DeRemer who has been there since 2014. In 2016 the Band of Pride played at Leesburg High School, Tarpon Springs High School, Santa Fe High School, and Columbia County High School before they played at state semi-finals.

Athletics 
Newberry High School's mascot is the "Panthers" or "Fighting Panthers". The girls' athletic teams use the name "Lady Panthers". The school offers eleven sports: baseball, basketball, cheerleading, football, golf, soccer, softball, tennis, track and field, volleyball, lacrosse, and weightlifting.

Newberry offers Varsity and Junior Varsity teams in both girls' and boys' basketball.

The high school's cheerleaders are split into the NHS Football Cheerleaders, the NHS Basketball Cheerleaders, and the NHS Competition Cheerleaders. The school also offers teams for girls' and boys' weightlifting teams, baseball, softball, volleyball, track and field, soccer, lacrosse, and tennis.

References

External links 
 Official website

High schools in Alachua County, Florida
Public high schools in Florida